Qiwña Milluku (Aymara and Quechua qiwña polylepis, Quechua milluku, ulluku a root vegetable, Hispanicized spelling Queuñamilloco) is a mountain in the Andes of Peru, about  high. It is situated in the Moquegua Region, Mariscal Nieto Province, Carumas District, and in the Puno Region, El Collao Province, Santa Rosa District. It lies northeast of the mountain Jach'a K'uchu.

References

Mountains of Moquegua Region
Mountains of Puno Region
Mountains of Peru